Philip Dundas (baptised 7 May 1762 – 8 April 1807) was a Scottish East India Company naval officer, president of the East India Marine Board, and superintendent of Bombay. He returned to Britain and became a member of parliament and returned to the Far East to become governor of Prince of Wales Island, now known as Penang.

Early life
Philip Dundas was the fourth son of Robert Dundas of Arniston, the younger, and his second wife, Jean, daughter of William Grant, Lord Prestongrange.

East India Company
Through the influence of his politically well connected uncle, Henry Dundas, 1st Viscount Melville, he was promoted from captain to president of the Marine Board and superintendent of Bombay from 1792 until 1801 (see Admiral-superintendent), during which time "he had £10,000 a year and accumulated £70,000 or £80,000, with which he returned to England".

Member of Parliament
On returning to Britain Dundas stood as a member of Parliament for English constituency of Gatton and having won the seat after a contested by-election (during which he was elected with a single vote cast) entered Parliament on 24 January 1803. He would remain in parliament for a little over two years, and although he remained a silent member, like other members of his family he voted in favour of measures that brought Addington administration to an end. In April 1805 he vacated his seat, leaving it at Pitt's disposal.

Prince of Wales Island
Very shortly after leaving Parliament, Dundas embarked on a voyage to the East Indies to take up the governorship of Prince of Wales Island. His uncle the Viscount Melville had long hoped to establish a naval arsenal.

The newly appointed Lieutenant-Governor of Penang, arrived at the newly created Presidency of the British East India Company, between 18 and 24 September 1805, together with his Council and the subordinate officials, including his Deputy Secretary, Stamford Raffles, who would form his new government.

The status of Penang (comprising Prince of Wales' Island and Province Wellesley) at this time, was such that it was on an equal footing with the three great Presidencies in India — Calcutta, Madras, and Bombay. Dundas was Governor of Prince of Wales Isle (Penang) from 1805 to 1807.

He created a red-light district so that he could control disease without having to discourage business. On board HMS Belliqueux, in the Bay of Bengal, he died on 8 April 1807 just two years after he arrived, ill health from unsanitary conditions taking him, and was buried in Penang a few days later.

Family
Dundas was married twice. In 1790 he married Penelope Ford Lindsay of Dublin. She died in 1802. They had no children.

On 5 May 1803 he married Margaret (died 1806),
 daughter of John Wedderburn of Ballendean (1729–1803) (and sister of Sir David Wedderburn, 1st Baronet (1775–1858)). They had two sons:
Robert Adam, who assumed the surnames of Christopher and then Nisbet-Hamilton. He became a Conservative Member of Parliament.
Philip Dundas (1806–1870), colonel in the army. On 30 October 1858 he married Lady Jane Charteris (died 1897), daughter of Francis, 7th Earl of Wemyss and March. They are buried together in the Old Kirkyard, Lasswade. They had no children.

Other
At least three ships were named for Dundas. See: Philip Dundas

Notes

References

1762 births
1807 deaths
People from Midlothian
History of Penang
British East India Company Army officers
Members of the Parliament of the United Kingdom for English constituencies
UK MPs 1802–1806
Administrators in British Penang